M. foliata may refer to:
 Misumena foliata, a synonym for Misumenops asperatus, a 'flower spider' species
 Myrmekiaphila foliata, a trapdoor spider species in the genus Myrmekiaphila

See also
 Foliata (disambiguation)